Brottby is a locality situated in Vallentuna Municipality, Stockholm County, Sweden with 262 inhabitants in 2018. In January 1998, the place was brought attention when the police intervened against a Neo-Nazi rock concert here.

Buildings
Össeby-Garn Church is a local parish church, located near the northern tip of Garnsviken. Built in the 13th century (with a porch added in the 15th), Össeby-Garn Church is a Romanesque stone church typical of Uppland. Two runestones have been placed outside the church, and another has been built into the church floor.

As the parishes of Össeby and Garn were merged in 1838, the Garn parish church (now Össeby-Garn Church) assumed the roles of Össeby Church whose building, already in a bad state of repair, was abandoned. Össeby Church was finally ruined in a fire in 1856.

 is an eight-sailed paltrok mill, an unusual type of windmill where the windmill body is supported on a ring of rollers on which it rotates to bring the sails into the wind. The windmill was built in the 1870s and ground grain until the late 1910s. After decades of decay, the mill was restored between 1989 and 1993 with six sails. Between 2010 and 2015 the windmill machinery was restored, allowing the mill to operate again, and the mill was re-equipped with its original number of eight sails.

References 

Populated places in Vallentuna Municipality